Han Jun (born November 1963) is a Chinese politician, who has served as the Communist Party secretary of Anhui since 2023.

He has additionally been serving since November 2020 as the governor of the Jilin Province.

Biography 
Han was born in Gaoqing County, Shandong. He graduated from Northwest Agricultural University (present-day Northwest A&F University) with a doctor degree in 1989. He had been served as the Deputy Chief of General Office of the Central Leading Small Group for Financial and Economic Affairs (2014–2018), the Chief of General Office of the Central Leading Small Group for Rural Work (2017–2020), and the Deputy Minister of Agriculture and Rural Affairs (2018–2020).

In November 2020, Han was named acting Governor of Jilin. He was elected as the Governor in January 2021.

Han is a delegate to the 13th National People's Congress.

References 

1963 births
Living people
Shandong Agricultural University alumni
Northwest A&F University alumni
Politicians from Zibo
Chinese Communist Party politicians from Shandong
Governors of Jilin
Members of the 20th Central Committee of the Chinese Communist Party
Delegates to the 13th National People's Congress
Chinese economists